Malygin or Malyhin is a Russian masculine surname, its feminine counterpart is Malygina or Malyhina. It may refer to

 Aleksandr Malygin (born 1979), Ukrainian football player
 Daria Malygina (born 1994), Russian volleyball player
 Ekaterina Malygina (born 1993), Russian group rhythmic gymnast
 Elena Malõgina (born 2000), Russian-born Estonian tennis player
 Stepan Malygin (died 1764), Russian Arctic explorer
 Vladimir Malygin (born 1950), Russian diplomat
 Volodymyr Malyhin (born 1949), Ukrainian football player, father of Aleksandr and Yuriy
 Yuriy Malyhin (born 1971), Ukrainian football player

Russian-language surnames
Ukrainian-language surnames